John Thomas Lambert (April 13, 1920 – February 18, 2002) was an American character actor who specialized in playing movie tough guys and heavies. He is best known for playing the psychotic cat-loving, iron-hooked Steve "the Claw" Michel in Dick Tracy's Dilemma.

Career 

Following a spell on Broadway, the Yonkers, New York-born Lambert moved to Hollywood and began working in films in 1942. He was a familiar figure in Westerns and crime dramas after World War II, in such movies as The Killers with Burt Lancaster and Ava Gardner, The Enforcer with Humphrey Bogart, Bend of the River with James Stewart, Vera Cruz with Gary Cooper and Burt Lancaster, Kiss Me Deadly with Ralph Meeker as Mike Hammer, and How the West Was Won.

Lambert also appeared in many television series of the 1950s and 1960s, such as Rod Cameron's State Trooper, twice on Bat Masterson (1959 in S1E22's "Incident in Leadville" and again in 1961 in S3E19's "Bullwhacker’s Bounty"), Gunsmoke (as all evil gunman Kin Creed in the 1959 S4E35 episode “There Never Was A Horse”, where he likely was the only man in the show's 20 year run who ever outdrew Matt Dillon - but missed), Have Gun – Will Travel, Sugarfoot, Tales of Wells Fargo, Daniel Boone, Wagon Train,  Bonanza,  Get Smart (season one, episode 18, 1966) and The Andy Griffith Show (season three, episode 32, 1963, "The Big House") From 1959 to 1960, Lambert was a regular cast member (as Joshua Walcek, sometimes called "Joshua MacGregor"), in 23 of the 42 episodes of the Darren McGavin series, Riverboat.

Personal life
In 1959 Lambert moved into a home in Palm Springs, California, owned by his wife Marjorie Franklin (who owned the home with her divorced husband Alexander Hall). He had a son, Lee J. Lambert.

Lambert is not to be confused with the British character actor with the same name who died in 1976.

Partial filmography

References

External links

 
 

1920 births
2002 deaths
American male film actors
American male stage actors
American male television actors
People from Yonkers, New York
Male actors from New York City
Male actors from Palm Springs, California
Western (genre) television actors
20th-century American male actors